Jordan High School is a secondary school in Jordan, Minnesota. It is part of the Independent School District (ISD) 717 school district.

History 
The current building was built in 2003 on Sunset Drive, and cost $20.5 million. Although it isn't known exactly when the first school in Jordan was built, estimates suggest that the first building was built in 1872.

Academics 
As of 2018, the enrollment in Jordan High School is 572, and the graduation rate is 95%.

Athletics 
Jordan has three mascots. The mascot for boys sports is the Hubmen, while the mascot for girls sports is the Jaguars. Because they collaborate with the nearby Belle Plaine Tigers for wrestling and nordic ski, the combined mascot is the Panthers.

References 

Schools in Minnesota